Kirill Andreyevich Kosarev (born 1 August 2001) is a Russian football player who plays as a striker for FC Volgar Astrakhan.

Club career
On 24 June 2020, he signed a 4-year contract with FC Rubin Kazan.

He made his debut for FC Rubin Kazan on 16 September 2020 in a Russian Cup game against FC Chernomorets Novorossiysk. He made his Russian Premier League debut for Rubin on 31 October 2020 in a game against FC Arsenal Tula.

On 20 February 2021, he was loaned to FC Tom Tomsk until the end of the 2020–21 season.

On 28 July 2021, he joined NK Hrvatski Dragovoljac on loan for the 2021–22 season.

After playing in four friendlies for Hrvatski Dragovoljac, he was recalled from loan and on 20 August 2021 he joined FC Nizhny Novgorod on loan instead. He reunited with Aleksandr Kerzhakov, who was his manager at Tom Tomsk in the previous season. He scored his first Russian Premier League goal for Nizhny Novgorod on 7 November 2021 in a game against FC Akhmat Grozny. 

On 22 February 2022, Kosarev was loaned to FC Volgar Astrakhan.

Career statistics

References

External links
 
 
 

2001 births
Sportspeople from Samara, Russia
Living people
Russian footballers
Russia youth international footballers
Russia under-21 international footballers
Association football forwards
FC Zenit-2 Saint Petersburg players
FC Rubin Kazan players
FC Tom Tomsk players
NK Hrvatski Dragovoljac players
FC Nizhny Novgorod (2015) players
FC Volgar Astrakhan players
Russian Premier League players
Russian First League players
Russian Second League players
Russian expatriate footballers
Expatriate footballers in Croatia
Russian expatriate sportspeople in Croatia